The Philippine leafbird (Chloropsis flavipennis) is a species of bird in the family Chloropseidae. It is endemic to the Philippines. It is found in the islands of Mindanao, Leyte, and Cebu.

Its natural habitat is tropical moist lowland forest. It is threatened by habitat loss. Its stronghold appears to be Mindanao, with populations small in Leyte and in Cebu, the species could already be extinct.

Description and Taxonomy 
EBird describes the bird as "A medium-sized bird of lowland and foothill forest canopy and edge. Overall bright green with a paler green chest and face and a yellowish throat, eye-ring, and edge to the wing. Note the brown bill and black wingtips and legs. No other green birds of this size occur in its range. Song consists of simple, medium-pitched whistled phrases or a series of repeated “tyup!” notes."

Habitat and Conservation Status 
Its natural habitats at tropical moist lowland primary forest and well developed secondary forest up to 970 meters above sea level.  It appears to not be able to tolerate great amounts of forest degradation. It is known to forage in the upper levels of the forest in the canopy.

IUCN has assessed this bird as vulnerable with the population being estimated at 600 to 1.700. Extensive lowland deforestation on all islands in its range is the main threat. Most remaining lowland forest that is not afforded protection leaving it vulnerable to both legal and Illegal logging, conversion into farmlands through Slash-and-burn and mining.

It occurs in the protected area of Pasonanca Natural Park but enforcement and protection from loggers is lax.

Conservation actions proposed are to survey remaining lowland forest tracts on Samar, Leyte and in poorly known areas of Mindanao, to establish its current distribution and population status. Following these surveys, Propose key sitesfor urgent establishment as protected areas. Study the habitat requirements of the species, with particular reference to the extent of reliance on primary forest habitats.

References

External links
BirdLife Species Factsheet
Image at ADW

Philippine leafbird
Endemic birds of the Philippines
Birds of Cebu
Birds of Mindanao
Fauna of Leyte
Philippine leafbird
Taxonomy articles created by Polbot